Sajwani is  a surname. Notable people with the surname include:

 Hussain Sajwani (born 1953), Emirati billionaire property developer
 Peter Sajwani (born 1977), Swedish darts player